Cyclea elegans is a species of flowering plants in the family Menispermaceae. It is found in Sumatra, Malaya, Borneo. An isotype is kept at Kew Gardens Herbarium. It was collected on Mount Kinabalu Dallas.

References

Other references 
 Ridl. in Fl. Mal. Pen. 1922: 115
 Burk. & Hend. Gard. Bull. S. S. 1925: 344
 Yamamota J. Soc. Trop. Agric. 1944: 145
 Yamamoto J. Soc. Trop. Agric. 1944: 145
 Forman Kew Bull. 1960: 71
 Heine Fedde, Rep. 54. 1951: 227
 Diels Pfl. R. 1910: 311
 Airy Shaw Kew Bull. 1940: 538

External links 
 
 Cyclea elegans at Flora Malesiana

Plants described in 1889
Flora of Borneo
Flora of Malaya
Flora of Sumatra
elegans